Toorale Station is a defunct pastoral lease that once operated as a sheep station and cattle station in New South Wales.  The station was purchased by the Federal and New South Wales Governments, and Toorale National Park was declared on a portion in 2010. The remaining area is now part of a  state conservation area.

The confluence of the Warrego River and the Darling River is located on the property.

History
It was first established in 1857.  The old shearing shed was built in 1873.

By 1880, it was owned by Sir Samuel Wilson.  When Sir Wilson went to England, Samuel McCaughey bought Toorale along with another property, Dunlop Station. In 1894 about 265,000 sheep were shorn there. McCaughy owned the property until 1913.

In 1892 the poet, Henry Lawson worked as a roustabout in the Toorale woolshed. Lawson composed many works including A Stranger on the Darling, Bourke and Bosses Boots while at working at Toorale. 

The Australian Sheep Farms Limited–with directors including Sir Arthur Stanley, R. H. Caird and G. Slade–raised £400,000 in capital to acquire Toorale, Dunlop and Nocoleche Stations in 1925.

Shearing in 1931 took nine weeks and had 24 shearers pass 81,000 sheep over the boards for 2,095 wool bales.

The last big wool clip from the station was in 1953 with 2,100 wool bales being produced. Toorale was owned by the Berawinnia Pastoral Company and had run flocks of between 50,000 to 100,000 sheep for the last several years. Much of the property was then resumed for soldier settlement.

In the same year it was acquired by the Federal and New South Wales Governments for 24 million. It had been planned to turn the area into a National Park with the century-old dams to be demolished with the water flowing into the river system. The  Toorale National Park was declared in 2010, the remaining area now being part of a state conservation area.

See also
List of ranches and stations

References

Pastoral leases in New South Wales
Stations (Australian agriculture)